Tyndall is the name of an English family taken from the land they held as tenants in chief of the Kings of England and Scotland in the 11th, 12th and 13th centuries.

Tyndall may also refer to:

People
 Edward Tyndall (born 1973), director of the 2012 film Reconvergence
 Edward Denis Tyndall (1890-1965), an 20th century Anglican priest
 George Tyndall, American gynecologist
 John Tyndall (1820–1893), Irish physicist
 Arthur Mannering Tyndall, (1881-1961), English physicist
 John Tyndall (poet) (born 1951), Canadian poet
 John Tyndall (politician) (1934–2005), English far-right politician

Places
 Tyndall, Manitoba, Canada, where Tyndall stone is quarried.
 Tyndall, South Dakota, USA, a city in Bon Homme County
 Tyndall Air Force Base, a USAF Base near Panama City, Florida
 Tyndall Landing, California, a community
 Tyndall's Park, Bristol, England
 Mount Tyndall in Sierra Nevada, California.
 Mount Tyndall (Tasmania) in West Coast Range, Tasmania

Other
 Tyndall (lunar crater)
 Tyndall (Martian crater)
 Tyndall effect

See also
 Tindal (disambiguation)
 Tyndale (disambiguation)